The 2004 World University Boxing Championships took place in Antalya, Turkey between November 22 and 29 2004. 129 boxers from 27 countries participated at the inaugural tournament.

Participating nations

Results
Bronze medals are awarded to both losing semi-finalists.

Medal count table

See also
 World University Championships

References

World University
World 2004
Sport in Antalya
21st century in Antalya
World University
World University Boxing Championships
Box
November 2004 sports events in Turkey